Eagle Wynne McMahon is an American professional disc golfer from Boulder, Colorado, sponsored by Discmania Golf Discs. He has 53 career wins (including two majors) and has been one of the highest rated players in the world for several years. At the end of the 2022 season he was ranked third in the world by UDisc.

Professional career

Early career
McMahon began playing disc golf in 2007, when he was nine years old, when he looked for a summer activity and soon started competing in smaller tournaments. His first victory in a PDGA-sanctioned event came in 2009 when he won the Johnny Roberts Memorial competing in the Junior II Boys class, later going on to win tournaments in both the intermediate and advanced classes. McMahon turned professional in 2011, entering three tournaments without cashing. The following year he entered five tournaments and cashed for the first time in the C-tier Mile High Classic. After cashing in two of the three C-tier tournaments he entered in 2013 he had his breakout season in 2014 when he turned 16, cashing in 14 of the 15 tournaments he entered, with three wins, 12 podium finishes and earned himself over $5,000. His most notable win was in the A-tier 2014 Colorado State Disc Golf Championship.

2015–present
In 2015 McMahon had his first full season as a touring pro, entering 29 tournaments, winning seven and earning over $15,000 in prize money. The following two seasons, 2016 and 2017, he continued to perform at a similar level, winning multiple times, as well as multiple podium finishes in National Tour events in 2017. In February 2018 he won his first national tour event, the Las Vegas Challenge, following this up with two more National Tour wins at the Glass Blown Open and Beaver State Fling, as well as his first major win at the Konopiště Open, in the Czech Republic; his overall performance that season earned him the National Tour title for 2018. Since that breakout season he has been one of the top players in the MPO division, winning multiple times in the DGPT, including four in 2021. In October 2021 he injured his throwing shoulder during filming for JomezPro, forcing him to withdraw from that year's Tour Championship. He returned to the tour at the beginning of the 2022 season, but was forced to take a three-month break from the tour to continue rehabilitating his shoulder injury. However, he still managed to notch his biggest win to date in the European Open on his return in July, remarkably while playing without a forehand but compensating by throwing some tee-shots with a left-handed backhand. After finishing 38th in the PDGA Professional Disc Golf World Championships a month later he played in only three other lower tier events before ending his season, winning the C-tier Boulder County Disc Golf Championships in his last outing of the year.

PDGA Rating 
The Professional Disc Golf Association has its own rating system. A players rating is based by the rounds of disc golf played the last 12 months in sanctioned events. McMahon broke the 1000-barrier rating wise at 14-years old, on June 24, 2014. The following years he has gone up in rating at a fast rate, until breaking the 1050-barrier 03/19/2019. In the rating-update as of October 2018, McMahon was the highest rated player in the world, tied with Paul McBeth at a rating of 1048. As of May 2020, only three players have achieved a rating of 1050 or above in the history of disc golf. McBeth was the first one to reach this rating, but was followed by McMahon and Ricky Wysocki.

Injuries 
Eagle has struggled with two bigger injuries since 2019. The first injury was in his elbow, but the most serious one came during the 2019 United States Disc Golf Championships (USDGC) after a self-inflicted fracture to his throwing hand, which later got diagnosed as a boxers fracture. This broken hand caused Eagle to abandon the last part of the 2019-season, but he was fully recovered when the 2020-season started.

Sponsorship
McMahon has been sponsored by Discmania and Grip Equipment during his professional career. After playing Disc golf for four years, he got sponsored as a 16 year old. During his time with Discmania, he has had great success with his signature discs.
McMahon is still sponsored by both companies as of 2023.

Notable victories 
McMahon has won 50 events, and some of the biggest victories are listed below.

References

American disc golfers
Sportspeople from Boulder, Colorado
Living people
Year of birth missing (living people)